Mikko Hyytiä (born July 12, 1981) is a Finnish professional ice hockey player who played with JYP Jyväskylä in the SM-liiga during the 2000-01 season. He was selected by the Montreal Canadiens in the 8th round (225th overall) of the 1999 NHL Entry Draft.

Awards and honours

References

External links

1981 births
Living people
Sportspeople from Jyväskylä
Finnish ice hockey centres
JYP Jyväskylä players
Montreal Canadiens draft picks